Rui Miguel Rodrigues Cardoso (born 17 February 1994) is a Portuguese footballer who plays as a defender.

Career
Cardoso was born in Lisbon. On 27 July 2013, he made his professional debut with Atlético in a 2013–14 Taça da Liga match against Académico Viseu, when he started  the game. In the first match of the  2013–14 Segunda Liga season against Sporting B on 11 August, he made his league debut.

References

External links

Stats and profile at LPFP

1994 births
Living people
Portuguese footballers
Footballers from Lisbon
Association football defenders
Liga Portugal 2 players
Atlético Clube de Portugal players